Wheels of Fire is the third album by the British rock band Cream. It was released in the US in June 1968 as a two-disc vinyl LP, with one disc recorded in the studio and the other recorded live. It was released in the UK on August 9. It reached number three in the United Kingdom and number one in the United States, Canada and Australia, becoming the world's first platinum-selling double album. In May 2012, Rolling Stone magazine ranked it at number 205 on its list of the 500 greatest albums of all time. It was voted number 757 in the third edition of Colin Larkin's All Time Top 1000 Albums (2000).

It was also released as two single LPs, Wheels of Fire (In the Studio) and Wheels of Fire (Live at the Fillmore), released together with similar cover art. In the UK the studio album art was black print on aluminium foil, while the live album art was a negative image of the studio cover. In Japan, the studio album art was black on gold foil, while the live album art was black on aluminium foil. In Australia, both covers were laminated copies of the Japanese releases.

Recording
Cream's third album was planned to be a double album on which Atco Records' producer Felix Pappalardi and the group would include several live performances. Unlike Disraeli Gears, which had been recorded in a matter of days, the Wheels of Fire sessions took place in small bursts over many months. The group and Pappalardi had, in July and August 1967, recorded studio material at IBC Studios in London. Recordings continued with short sessions at Atlantic Studios in September, October and December 1967. Further work took place at Atlantic in February 1968, during a break from the band's heavy tour schedule. The following month, Pappalardi ordered that a mobile recording studio in Los Angeles be shipped to the Fillmore Auditorium and the Winterland Ballroom in San Francisco. Six shows were recorded in San Francisco by Pappalardi and recording engineer Bill Halverson, and extra performances not included on Wheels of Fire ended up on Live Cream and Live Cream Volume II. Studio recordings and mixing for the album were completed in June 1968, nearly a year after they had started.

Production and artwork
The recording engineers on disc one were Tom Dowd and Adrian Barber. The songs on disc two were recorded by Bill Halverson, and the performances on the second disc were mixed by Adrian Barber. The artwork for the album was by Martin Sharp, who had also done the artwork for Disraeli Gears. The photography was by Jim Marshall.

Songs
The band's drummer Ginger Baker co-wrote three songs for the album with pianist Mike Taylor. Bassist Jack Bruce co-wrote four songs with poet Pete Brown. Guitarist Eric Clapton contributed to the album by choosing two blues songs to cover.

For the second disc, Felix Pappalardi chose "Traintime" because it featured Jack Bruce's singing and harmonica playing, and "Toad" because it featured Ginger Baker's lengthy drum solo, while "Spoonful" and "Crossroads" were used to showcase Eric Clapton's guitar playing.

Track listing

Disc one: In the Studio

Disc two: Live at the Fillmore

Performers on disc one are "the Cream quartet" consisting of Clapton, Baker, and Bruce together with Felix Pappalardi, who plays many different instruments and is also credited with production.

 Some pressings of this album contain a longer version of "Passing the Time". The "long version" is extended by one minute and 13 seconds, and was included on the gold CD issued by DCC Compact Classics. An "extended version" included on Those Were the Days is an additional seven seconds longer.

 Original pressings of Wheels of Fire incorrectly listed the running time of "Deserted Cities of the Heart" at 4:36. This incorrect time was still present on 1980s pressings in the UK.

 Some songs on the studio album were processed with the Haeco-CSG system. Also processed was "Anyone for Tennis", which was released as a single. Haeco-CSG was intended to make stereo recordings that were compatible with mono playback but has the unfortunate side effect of "blurring" the phantom centre channel. On Wheels of Fire this side effect is particularly noticeable during Eric Clapton's guitar solo on "Deserted Cities of the Heart".

 Original album pressings list "John Group" as the author of "Traintime". The "John Group" appellation dates back to Jack Bruce's tenure with the Graham Bond Organisation (with whom Bruce originally recorded the song in 1965) and was used by that band to ensure that members other than Bond received songwriting royalties. The song is based on a vintage blues by Peter Chatman.

While the second disc is labelled Live at the Fillmore, only "Toad" was recorded there. The other three tracks were recorded at the Winterland Ballroom.

In 2014, Japan Polydor released a two-disc limited edition SHM-CD (UICY-76024/5) with four bonus tracks: two on the studio disc, and two on the live one.

2014 Japan Polydor 2-disc Limited Edition bonus tracks

Disc one
 "Anyone for Tennis" (Eric Clapton, Martin Sharp)
 "Falstaff Beer Commercial" (Clapton, Ginger Baker, Jack Bruce)

Disc two
  "Sunshine of Your Love" (Clapton, Bruce, Pete Brown)
 "N.S.U." (Bruce)

Personnel
Per liner notes
Jack Bruce – lead vocals, bass guitar, cello, harmonica, calliope, acoustic guitar, recorder
Ginger Baker – drums, percussion, bells, glockenspiel, timpani, vocals, spoken word on "Pressed Rat and Warthog"
Eric Clapton – guitar, vocals
Felix Pappalardi – viola, bells, organ, trumpet, tonette
Tom Dowd – recording engineer on disc one
Adrian Barber – recording engineer on disc one, re-mix engineer on disc two
Joseph M. Palmaccio – digital remastering
Martin Sharp – art
Jim Marshall – photography

Personnel and information for the studio sessions
"White Room"
Recorded at IBC Studios, July and August 1967; Atlantic Studios, September, 9–10 October, and 12–15 December 1967; 13–22 February and 12–13 June 1968
 Eric Clapton – lead and rhythm guitars
 Jack Bruce – vocals, bass
 Ginger Baker – drums, timpani
 Felix Pappalardi – viola

"Sitting on Top of the World"
Recorded at IBC Studios, July 1967; Atlantic Studios, September 1967
 Eric Clapton – lead and rhythm guitars
 Jack Bruce – vocals, bass
 Ginger Baker – drums

"Born Under a Bad Sign"
Recorded at IBC Studios, July and August 1967; Atlantic Studios, September 1967
 Eric Clapton – lead and rhythm guitars
 Jack Bruce – vocals, bass
 Ginger Baker – drums, tambourine

"Pressed Rat and Warthog"
Recorded at Atlantic Studios, 9–10 October and 12–15 December 1967; 13–22 February 1968
 Eric Clapton – lead and rhythm guitars 
 Jack Bruce – basses, recorder
 Ginger Baker – spoken-word vocals, drums
 Felix Pappalardi – trumpet, tonette

"Anyone for Tennis"
Recorded at Atlantic Studios, 9–10 October and 12–15 December 1967; 13–22 February 1968
 Eric Clapton – vocals, acoustic guitar, slide guitar
 Jack Bruce – bass, recorder
 Ginger Baker – congas
 Felix Pappalardi – viola

"Passing the Time"
Recorded at Atlantic Studios, 13–22 February and 12–13 June 1968
 Eric Clapton – backing vocals, lead and rhythm guitars
 Jack Bruce – lead vocals, bass, cello, calliope
 Ginger Baker – backing vocals, drums, glockenspiel
 Felix Pappalardi – organ pedals

"As You Said"
Recorded at Atlantic Studios, 13–22 February and 12–13 June 1968
 Jack Bruce – vocals, acoustic guitars, cello
 Ginger Baker – hi-hat

"Politician"
Recorded at Atlantic Studios, 13–22 February and 12–13 June 1968
 Eric Clapton – lead and rhythm guitars
 Jack Bruce – vocals, bass
 Ginger Baker – drums

"Deserted Cities of the Heart"
Recorded at Atlantic Studios, 13–22 February and 12–13 June 1968
 Eric Clapton – lead and rhythm guitar
 Jack Bruce – vocals, bass, cello, acoustic guitar
 Ginger Baker – drums, tambourine
 Felix Pappalardi – viola

"Those Were the Days"
Recorded at Atlantic Studios, 12–13 June 1968
 Eric Clapton – backing vocals, lead and rhythm guitars
 Jack Bruce – lead vocals, bass
 Ginger Baker – drums, marimba, tubular bells
 Felix Pappalardi – Swiss hand bells

Charts and certifications

Weekly charts

Certifications

References

External links
The making of Wheels of Fire – from the Official Ginger Baker Archive
Double and single album releases

Cream (band) albums
1968 albums
Polydor Records albums
Albums recorded at the Fillmore
Atco Records albums
1968 live albums
Polydor Records live albums
Albums produced by Felix Pappalardi
Albums recorded at IBC Studios
Acid rock albums
Atco Records live albums